

170001–170100 

|-id=006
| 170006 Stoughton ||  || Chris Stoughton (born 1959), American astronomer with the Sloan Digital Sky Survey || 
|-id=007
| 170007 Strateva ||  || Iskra Strateva (born 1975), Bulgarian-born, former American astronomer with the Sloan Digital Sky Survey || 
|-id=008
| 170008 Michaelstrauss ||  || Michael Strauss (born 1961), American astronomer with the Sloan Digital Sky Survey || 
|-id=009
| 170009 Subbarao ||  || Mark Subbarao (born 1968), an American astronomer with the Sloan Digital Sky Survey. || 
|-id=010
| 170010 Szalay ||  || Alex Szalay (born 1949), American astronomer with the Sloan Digital Sky Survey || 
|-id=011
| 170011 Szkody ||  || Paula Szkody (born 1948), American astronomer with the Sloan Digital Sky Survey || 
|-id=012
| 170012 Anithakar ||  || Ani Thakar (born 1960), American astronomer with the Sloan Digital Sky Survey || 
|-id=022
| 170022 Douglastucker ||  || Douglas Tucker (born 1965), American astronomer with the Sloan Digital Sky Survey || 
|-id=023
| 170023 Vogeley ||  || Michael S. Vogeley (born 1965), American astronomer with the Sloan Digital Sky Survey || 
|-id=073
| 170073 Ivanlinscott ||  || Ivan R. Linscott (born 1942) is an emeritus research scientist for Stanford University, who served as a science team co-investigator and as Principal Investigator of the REX Radio Science Instrument for the New Horizons mission to Pluto. || 
|}

170101–170200 

|-id=162
| 170162 Nicolashayek ||  || Nicolas Hayek (1928–2010), Swiss-Lebanese entrepreneur best known for the Swatch. He has also been a member of the Jura Astronomy Society, owner of the Jura Observatory, where this minor planet was discovered || 
|}

170201–170300 

|-bgcolor=#f2f2f2
| colspan=4 align=center | 
|}

170301–170400 

|-id=306
| 170306 Augustzátka ||  || August Zátka (1847–1935), Czech personality of České Budějovice || 
|-id=395
| 170395 Nicolevogt ||  || Nicole Vogt (born 1967), American astronomer with the Sloan Digital Sky Survey || 
|}

170401–170500 

|-id=487
| 170487 Mallder ||  || Valerie A. Mallder (born 1963) is a systems engineer at the Johns Hopkins University Applied Physics Laboratory, who served as a Deputy Mission Systems Engineer for the New Horizons mission to Pluto. || 
|}

170501–170600 

|-bgcolor=#f2f2f2
| colspan=4 align=center | 
|}

170601–170700 

|-id=700
| 170700 Marygoldaross ||  || Mary Golda Ross (1908–2008) was a Native American (Cherokee) mathematician and aerospace pioneer with Lockheed, whose projects included the Agena program and interplanetary probes. A passionate educator, Ross advocated for engineering and mathematics opportunities for women and Native Americans. || 
|}

170701–170800 

|-bgcolor=#f2f2f2
| colspan=4 align=center | 
|}

170801–170900 

|-id=879
| 170879 Verbeeckje ||  || Elena Verbeeck (born 2010) daughter of Francis Verbeeck, friend of Belgian astronomer Peter De Cat who discovered this minor planet || 
|-id=900
| 170900 Jendrassik ||  || György Jendrassik (1898–1954), a Hungarian mechanical engineer who designed the world's first turboprop engine || 
|}

170901–171000 

|-id=906
| 170906 Coluche ||  || Michel Colucci (1944–1986), better known as "Coluche", French comedian and actor || 
|-id=909
| 170909 Bobmasterson ||  || Bob Masterson (born 1951), an accomplished amateur astronomer and astrophotographer. || 
|-id=910
| 170910 Brandonsanderson ||  || Brandon Sanderson (born 1975), a renowned American fantasy author. || 
|-id=927
| 170927 Dgebessire ||  || Gérad Bessire (born 1953), a biologist and pedagogue from Courroux, Switzerland || 
|-id=995
| 170995 Ritajoewright ||  || Rita (born 1953) and Joseph (born 1962) Wright are enthusiastic outreach astronomers in the Kansas City area. Together they have hosted countless evenings under the stars, mostly at the Warkoczewski Public Observatory, and have led the Heart of America star party, one of the largest gatherings in the U.S., for many years. || 
|}

References 

170001-171000